Mick Hume (born 1959) is a British journalist and author whose writing focuses on issues of free speech and freedom of the press.

Hume was a columnist for The Times for ten years from 1999, and was described as "Britain's only libertarian Marxist newspaper columnist". He has more recently written for The Sun, The Times and The Sunday Times.

Hume was born in New Haw, Surrey, and educated at Woking County Grammar School for Boys and the University of Manchester. In his twenties, Hume became editor of the next step, newspaper of the now-defunct Revolutionary Communist Party, of which Hume was a member for a decade until it folded. In 1988 he launched the party's magazine, Living Marxism.

After the RCP folded in 1996, Hume helped to relaunch the magazine as LM, which he edited until it was forced to close in 2000 after losing a libel suit brought by ITN, over claims that the magazine had made concerning ITN's reporting of Trnopolje camp in Bosnia.

In 2001, Hume was launch editor of the online magazine Spiked, the UK's first web-only comment and current affairs publication. He is now Spikeds editor-at-large.

Hume's book, There Is No Such Thing As a Free Press – and we need one more than ever was published in October 2012 in response to the Leveson Inquiry and the debate about press regulation in the UK. Daniel Finkelstein of The Times described it as "a masterclass in the writing of polemic".

References

Books
 Trigger Warning: Is the Fear of Being Offensive Killing Free Speech? (HarperCollins, 2015),

External links
 Mick Hume's column in The Times

1959 births
Alumni of the University of Manchester
British male journalists
British republicans
British social commentators
Living people
Revolutionary Communist Party (UK, 1978) members
British libertarians
People from the Borough of Runnymede
Deniers of the Bosnian genocide